Montemignaio Castle (Castello di Montemignaio) is a castle in the commune of Montemignaio, Province of Arezzo, Tuscany, Italy.

Footnotes

Castles in Tuscany